Kord Mahalleh may refer to:
 Kord Mahalleh, Fuman, Gilan Province
 Kord Mahalleh, Lahijan, Gilan Province
 Kord Mahalleh, Sowme'eh Sara, Gilan Province
 Kord Mahalleh, Babol, Mazandaran Province
 Kord Mahalleh, Behshahr, Mazandaran Province
 Kord Mahalleh, Chalus, Mazandaran Province
 Kord Mahalleh, Nur, Mazandaran Province